Goniurellia persignata is a species of tephritid or fruit flies in the genus Goniurellia of the family Tephritidae.

Distribution
Morocco, Egypt, Ethiopia, Cyprus, Israel, Turkmenistan, China, Sri Lanka.

References

Tephritinae
Insects described in 1980
Diptera of Europe
Diptera of Africa
Diptera of Asia